The Great Subconscious Club is the debut album of the Belgian band K's Choice recorded in 1994. It was originally produced under the name The Choice, but the band changed names. "Me Happy", "Breakfast", "I Smoke a Lot" and "The Ballad of Lea & Paul" were released as singles. The name of the album is taken from the lyrics to the song "Try To Get Some Sleep", the B-side of "I Smoke a Lot", which also appeared on the compilation Extra Cocoon. At this time the band merely existed out of Sam (then Sarah) and Gert Bettens, who were joined by others (who didn't return for any of the later albums of K's Choice).

Track listing

Personnel
 Sam Bettens - Vocals
 Gert Bettens - Guitar, keyboards, vocals, drawing  
 Jean Blaute -  Bass guitar, guitar, keyboards, producer  
 Luk Degraaff - Bass guitar
 Evert Verhees - Bass guitar
 Stoy Stoffelen - Percussion, drums
 Walter Mets - Percussion, drums  
 Marc Francois - Engineer
 Werner Pensaert - Engineer
 Vladimir Meller - Mastering  
 Jurgen Rogiers - Photography

Release details

References

1994 debut albums
K's Choice albums
Sony Music Belgium albums